Manahawkin Bay is a bay in the U.S. state of New Jersey in Ocean County, located between Long Beach Island and Manahawkin, on the mainland. It is a part of the Intracoastal Waterway.

Sources
Manahawkin Bay USGS Ship Bottom Quad, New Jersey, Topographic Map. Tropozone. Online. July 2, 2008.

Bays of New Jersey
Bodies of water of Ocean County, New Jersey
Intracoastal Waterway
Long Beach Island